Eoreuma loftini, the Mexican rice borer, is a moth in the family Crambidae. It was described by Harrison Gray Dyar Jr. in 1917. It is found in the southern United States, where it has been recorded from California, Arizona, Texas, Louisiana and Florida. It is also found in Mexico.

The wingspan is about 12 mm. Adults are light tan. The forewings with a small black central dot and two faint, blackish longitudinal streaks.

The larvae feed on various grasses, including sugarcane and rice. They bore into the stem or stalk of their host plant. The larvae are whitish with a light-colored head. Pupation takes place inside the stem or stalk.

References

Haimbachiini
Moths described in 1917